Molotov may refer to:

 Vyacheslav Molotov (1890–1986), Soviet politician and diplomat, and foreign minister under Joseph Stalin 
 Molotov cocktail, hand-held incendiary weapon

Arts and entertainment
Molotov (band), a Mexican rock/rap band
Molotov Movement, a Danish hip hop collective 
Molotov (EP), by The Bruisers, 1998
Sergei Molotov, a fictional character from the Empire Earth video game
Molotov Cocktease, a character in The Venture Bros. TV series
”Molotov”, single by Kira Puru, 2018

Places
Oktyabrkənd, Azerbaijan, city formerly named Molotov
Perm, Russia, city named Molotov between 1940 and 1957 in honour of Vyacheslav Molotov

Other uses
Soviet cruiser Molotov, a 1939 warship
Vyacheslav Molotov, a Iosif Stalin-class passenger ship

See also
 

Russian-language surnames